Stanhopea platyceras is a species of orchid endemic to Colombia.

References

External links 
 Photos

platyceras
Endemic orchids of Colombia